Johannes Peter "Hans" Riegel, also known as Hans Riegel Jr. (10 March 1923 – 15 October 2013), was a German entrepreneur who owned and operated the confectioner Haribo since 1946.

Biography 
Born in Bonn, Riegel was the oldest son of the company's founder Hans Riegel Sr., who invented the gummy bear in 1922. The name of the company, Haribo, comes from the first two letters of his name and where he was from (HANS RIEGEL BONN). Riegel was captured and held as an Allied prisoner-of-war during World War II. Upon his release, Riegel returned to Bonn, and, along with his brother Paul, assumed leadership of Haribo in 1946. After his graduation from the Jesuit boarding school Aloisiuskolleg, he did his doctorate in 1951 at Bonn University with his thesis "The development of the world sugar industry during and after the Second World War".

In 1953, Riegel was elected first president of the German badminton association (Deutscher Badminton-Verband) after he had won the German championship in the men's doubles. In 1954 and 1955 he won the mixed doubles title. In the same year, he organized the construction of the first indoor badminton court in Germany, called the Haribo-Centre, in Bonn.

Riegel owned the Jakobsburg Hotel and Golf resort near Boppard in the Rhine Valley in Germany.

References

External links

Haribo corporate website

Businesspeople from Bonn
German billionaires
German male badminton players
University of Bonn alumni
Businesspeople in confectionery
Officers Crosses of the Order of Merit of the Federal Republic of Germany
1923 births
2013 deaths
Chevaliers of the Légion d'honneur
Recipients of the Decoration of Honour for Services to the Republic of Austria
20th-century German businesspeople
21st-century German businesspeople